Dennis St John (27 September 1928 - 6 November 2007) was a British actor who most notably portrayed Franz von Papen in Yves Simoneau's Nuremberg.

St John was born 27 September 1928 in Lambeth where he studied drama at the British Theatre Association. He emigrated to Canada in 1967 where he began acting professionally at the Concordia University in Montréal. St John died at 79 in 2007 following health complications from his treatment for his leukemia.

Filmography 

1989: The Scorpio Factor - Tag
1989: The Tell Tale Heart - The Old Man
1990: You're Driving Me Crazy - Father
1993: Map of the Human Heart - Moravian Minister (uncredited)
1995: Chasseurs de loups, chasseurs d'or (TV Series) - Principal
1995: Hiroshima (TV Movie) - Walter Bartky
1996: Go West (TV Mini-Series) - Fowler
1998: The Minion - Gregor
1998: Captive (TV Movie) - Shoe Shine Man
1999: Quand je serai parti... vous vivrez encore - Lord Russell (uncredited)
1999: Back to Sherwood (TV Series) - The Abbott
1999: Bonanno: A Godfather's Story (TV Movie) - Station Railway Clerk
1999: P.T. Barnum (TV Movie) - Beefeater
2000: Nuremberg (TV Mini-Series) - Franz von Papen
2000: The List - Priest
2001: The Sign of Four - Sherman
2002: Summer (TV Movie) - Professor Ridley
2002: Heartstrings (Short) - The Salesman
2004: The Aviator - Nick the Custodian
2004: Il Duce canadese (TV Mini-Series) - Piano teacher
2005: The Greatest Game Ever Played - Wallis' Butler
2005: Ten Days to Victory (TV Movie documentary) - Old Man
2006: Bethune (TV Movie) - Old Man
2006: 300 - Spartan Baby Inspector
2007: I'm Not There - Captain Henry
2007: Still Life - Museum Snob 1

References

External links 
 

English male film actors
1928 births
2007 deaths
English male television actors